The Migneint is a large expanse of moorland in central Snowdonia, north-west Wales. It is either the largest area of blanket bog in Wales, or the second largest, after the Berwyn range, further to the east.

The area includes a few small lakes, including Llyn Conwy, the source of the River Conwy, and is bisected by the B4407 road from Ffestiniog to Ysbyty Ifan.

Plans have been suggested to hold water on the Migneint for longer, to help prevent flooding in the Conwy valley; but local farmers have voiced concern that this could be harmful to livestock.

References

External links
Photos of Migneint and surrounding area at Geograph
Migneint is at coordinates  / 

Bogs of Wales
Landforms of Conwy County Borough
Landforms of Gwynedd
Wetland Sites of Special Scientific Interest
Ysbyty Ifan
Bro Machno
Moorlands of Wales